Bridgeport High School is a public high school located in the city of Bridgeport, Texas, United States. It is classified as a 4A school by the UIL. It is a part of the Bridgeport Independent School District located in west central Wise County.   In 2015, the school was rated "Met Standard" by the Texas Education Agency.

Athletics
The Bridgeport Bulls compete in the following sports:
 Baseball
 Basketball
 Cross country 
 Football
 Golf
 Powerlifting 
 Soccer
 Softball
 Tennis
 Track
 Volleyball

State titles
Boys' basketball
2015 (4A)
Soccer
State Runner-Up 2016 (4A)

Academics
UIL Academic Meet Champions
1995 (3A), 1996 (3A), 1997 (3A), 1998 (1A), 2000 (3A), 2001 (3A), 2003 (3A)

References

External links
Bridgeport ISD website

Public high schools in Texas
Schools in Wise County, Texas